Xue Yong is a fictional character in Water Margin, one of the Four Great Classical Novels of Chinese literature. Nicknamed "Sick Tiger", he ranks 84th among the 108 Stars of Destiny and 48th among the 72 Earthly Fiends.

Background
Xue Yong, a native of Luoyang in Henan, is a skilled fighter who specialises in staff and spear. His grandfather was a military officer stationed at the northwest frontier of the Song Empire. But he was sacked from the military, with his family forever refused enlistment, after he offended some colleagues. Xue Yong makes a living by performing martial stunts in public for tips from onlookers. He is nicknamed "Sick Tiger".

Meeting Song Jiang
Drifting from place to place, Xue Yong one day arrives at Jieyang Town near the Xunyang River. Perhaps unaware of the consequence, he did not go to pay respects to the Mu brothers (Mu Hong and Mu Chun), who are feared in Jieyang, before doing his roadside performance. Feeling insulted, the Mus forbid the townsfolk from patronising him. Song Jiang is on the way to his exile in Jiangzhou (江州; present-day Jiujiang), a reduced sentence for killing his mistress Yan Poxi, when he passes by Jieyang Town. He comes upon Xue doing his show and tips him generously out of pity that he is not awarded a cent despite his laudable performance. Mu Chun, who is among the onlookers, is enraged and rushes forth to beat Song. But he is floored by Xue Yong.

Xue Yong is elated to learn that the exile is Song Jiang, whose fame for chivalry spreads afar. After parting with Song, whom he promises to meet in Jiangzhou, Xue returns to his inn to check out. Just then, Mu Chun appears with his men, who overwhelm him with their number. After tying Xue up in his manor and flogging him, Mu Chun goes to hunt for Song Jiang. Meanwhile, Song and his two escorts have been offered lodgings by the Mus' kindly father in their manor after all the inns and homes in the town, in compliance with Mu Chun's order, denied him accommodation. Mu Chun finds his brother Mu Hong and together they pursue Song Jiang, who has fled with his two escorts upon discovering they had landed in their house.

In desperation, Song Jiang boards the boat of pirate boatman Zhang Heng. Midway across the Xunyang River, Zhang wants to kill and rob the three men. But his friend Li Jun, who has recently befriended Song Jiang at Jieyang Ridge, comes by in his boat and saves Song in the nick of time. Zhang is shocked to learn that the exile is the chivalrous hero Song Jiang. The Mu brothers, who wait at the bank, are similarly surprised to know his identity. The Mus release Xue Yong and the whole group treat Song as an honoured guest until he leaves for Jiangzhou.

Joining Liangshan
Found to have written a seditious poem on a wall in a restaurant in Jiangzhou, Song Jiang is sentenced to death. The chieftains of Liangshan Marsh rush to Jiangzhou and rescue him just when he is going to be beheaded. After fleeing Jiangzhou, the group is stranded at a riverbank. Just then Li Jun, Xue Yong and other friends Song Jiang made recently in the Jieyang region arrive in their boats on their way to save Song Jiang. They ferry the outlaws to the Mus' manor.

Before going to Liangshan, Song Jiang wants to take revenge on Huang Wenbing, the petty official who found and reported his poem. Xue Yong recommends his martial arts student Hou Jian, who works as a tailor in Huang's house, to lead them to the official's home. With Hou tricking the Huang family to open the door, the outlaws get into the house and massacre everyone. Meanwhile, Zhang Shun captures Huang on the Xunyang River. After cutting up Huang, the group, including Xue Yong, make their way to Liangshan.

Campaigns and death
Xue Yong is appointed as one of the leaders of the Liangshan infantry after the 108 Stars of Destiny came together in what is called the Grand Assembly. He participates in the campaigns against the Liao invaders and rebel forces in Song territory following amnesty from Emperor Huizong.for Liangshan.

In the attack on Yuling Pass (昱嶺關; near present-day Zhupu Village, She County, Anhui) in the campaign against Fang La, Xue Yong, along with a few other Liangshan heroes, is fatally shot by the archers of the enemy general Pang Wanchun.

Notes

References
 
 
 
 
 
 
 

72 Earthly Fiends
Fictional characters from Henan
Fictional buskers